Nikol Krasiuk (born 25 January 2004) is a Ukrainian rhythmic gymnast, member of the national group.

Career 
Nikol debuted in 2019 at the Junior World Championships in Moscow, where she ended 16th in teams, 9th with rope, 37th with ball, 5th in the clubs final and 19th with ribbon.

In 2022, after part of the previous team retired after the 2020 Olympics, she was incorporated into the national senior group. After a rough start because of the invasion of Ukraine, they debuted at the World Cup in Pesaro being 11th in the All-Around and 6th with 3 ribbons and 2 balls. In June she competed in Tel Aviv at the European Championships, taking 10th place in the All-Around and 6th with 5 hoops. She also participated in the World Championships in Sofia along Yelyzaveta Azza, Diana Baieva, Daryna Duda, Anastasiya Voznyak, Oleksandra Yushchak and the individuals Viktoriia Onopriienko, Polina Karika and Polina Horodnycha, finishing 12th in the All-Around and with 5 hoops as well as 11th with 3 ribbons and 2 balls.

References 

2004 births
Living people
Ukrainian rhythmic gymnasts
People from Kharkiv